LGBT Foundation (formerly known as The Lesbian & Gay Foundation) is a national charity based in Manchester with a wide portfolio of services. With a history dating back nearly 40 years, it campaigns for a fair and equal society where all lesbian, gay, bisexual and trans (LGBT) people are able to reach their full potential. They support over 40,000 people directly every year, and a further 600,000 online. They provide direct services and resources to more LGBT people than any other charity of its kind in the UK.

The charity is governed by a board of trustees from a variety of backgrounds and with a wide variety of skills and qualifications. The trustees are supported by a Chief Executive, Deputy Chief Executive, Director of Operations, Director of Development and four Deputy Directors who oversee directorates for Delivery, Inclusion, Income Generation and Finance. The charity provides a broad range of support services including substance misuse, domestic abuse, sexual health testing, talking therapies, wellbeing, community safety, trans advocacy, LGBTQ+ armed forces/veterans, smoking cessation and the Indigo Gender Service. LGBT Foundation also offers support programmes for all LGBTQ+ communities including, bisexual,  transgender, non-binary and QTIPOC (queer, transgender and intersex people of colour) communities.

History 

The origin of the LGBT Foundation was in the Manchester Lesbian and Gay Switchboard Services (MLGSS), which began on 2 January 1975 when six gay men got together to provide an information and support service for the growing number of gay men coming out following the decriminalisation of homosexuality in 1967. The line ran from 7 to 9pm each evening with calls being taken about a wide range of issues. Over the decades, the services broadened out to include counselling, group work and email support.

In April 2000, MLGSS unified with Healthy Gay Manchester (HGM) to form the Lesbian & Gay Foundation (LGF). Drawing upon experience gained from MeSMAC Manchester, HGM was formed in 1994 by Paul Martin OBE (current Chief Executive of LGBT Foundation), and Gerard Gudgion with a clear aim to reduce the incidence of HIV infection through sex between men. Famed for its ground-breaking approach to safer sex campaigning, HGM was a pioneering gay men's health organisation offering free condoms and personal lubricant, counselling, services, groups and volunteering opportunities such as condom packing evenings.

In April 2015, the LGF adopted the name LGBT Foundation.

The LGBT Foundation has witnessed and responded to and impacted a number of national and international developments for LGBT equality 
LGBT Foundation co-operated with Manchester Pride for the organisation of its yearly "Pride" event. It used to provide media partnership to Manchester Pride with its own magazine, Out North West, until the magazine was discontinued.

Current work 

As of 2019, LGBT Foundation is the largest LGBT health and community services charity in the UK, offering a range of services serving over 40,000 people in person and over 600,000 people online every year.

LGBT Foundation provides a wide range of wellbeing and support services. Their domestic abuse programme provides practical housing advice, 1:1 casework support and advice sessions to LGBT victims of domestic abuse. Their substance misuse programme provides 1-2-1 and group support for those addicted to drugs and/or alcohol. Their talking therapies team deliver LGBT-affirmative counselling support. Their befriending service helps people to build their support networks, make friends and reduce loneliness. The Foundation Direct helpline – the organisation's oldest service - provides crisis email and phone support to over 5,000 people every year.

They operate a sexual health testing service for men who have sex with men and LGBT people. Over the past year they have delivered 498 rapid HIV tests and 260 full sexual health screenings alongside providing access to sexual wellbeing advice and support. They also do outreach testing across Greater Manchester. Each year their sexual health team distributes over a quarter of a million loose condoms and sachets of lube.

Pride in Practice is LGBT Foundation's quality assurance support service that strengthens and develops Primary Care Services relationship with their lesbian, gay, bisexual and trans patients within the local community. As of 2019, 2.1 million patients in Greater Manchester are now registered at Pride in Practice accredited GP practices.

The Village Angels and Village Haven are LGBT Foundation's night-time safety and harm reduction projects. They provide support to vulnerable people in Manchester's historic Gay Village on a Friday and Saturday evening from 9pm to 5am. The Village Angels was first established in 2011, where a team of volunteers and a first-aid trained shift lead patrolling the Gay Village every Friday and Saturday from 9pm to 3am, wearing the hot pink uniforms for which they are renowned. In 2016, they piloted an expansion of the Angels programme - the Village Haven. The Village Haven is a night time safe haven for those too vulnerable to be out on the streets. Following the success of this pilot, the Village Haven became a permanent fixture of LGBT Foundation's community safety programme in 2017 working continually in tandem with the Village Angels. Each year the programmes support 5,000 people every year, including 450 highly vulnerable people.  In 2017, they partnered with Smirnoff as part of their "We're Open" campaign making a short video about the Angels work and to begin expanding the programme nationally. In 2018, the Village Angels and Haven volunteers won the "Dedication to Volunteering" award at the Greater Manchester Health and Care Champions Awards, an initiative of the Greater Manchester Combined Authority and the NHS. In 2019, the Village Angels were awarded the Queen's Award for Voluntary Service, the highest honour a voluntary group can receive in the UK.

LGBT Foundation has dedicated Men's and Women's Programmes. In 2019, LGBT+ Futures Fund announced they would fund the Men's Programme to continue to delivering creative activities for gay, bisexual and trans men. The Women's Programme works to support and empower all lesbian and bisexual women to improve their health and wellbeing, increase their skills, knowledge and confidence, and reducing their feelings of isolation. Through their events, workshops and community leaders project, the Women's Programme has gone from providing one event per month to ensuring at least one activity per week for lesbian, bi, queer and trans women. They also manage over 2,500 meetup members and 2,500 bulletin subscribers with content dedicated to lesbian and bi women, and support over 2,000 women a year have greater access to targeted information through outreach and netreach. In 2019, to mark International Women's Day, they unveiled the preliminary results of The National Sexual Wellbeing Survey for Women who have Sex with Women. It was the largest research of its kind for over a decade. In 2019, the Women's Programme was nominated for the 'Inclusion Champion' award at the Greater Manchester Health and Care Champions Awards.

LGBT Foundation also has a dedicated Trans Programme which supports people with services, events and groups. They also have a Trans Advocacy service, which provides practical support to those facing barriers to services or experiencing discrimination.

More recently, LGBT Foundation has expanded its operations to Greater London. The Soho Angels, a night-time harm reduction programme based upon the Village Angels, was established in Soho in 2018 in collaboration with Westminster City Council and Smirnoff. The Government Equalities Office to had commissioned the LGBT Foundation to roll out Pride in Practice through five London clinical commissioning groups (CCGs) —  Lewisham, Southwark, Lambeth, Wandsworth CCG and North West London. Nationally, Eastern Cheshire, Mid Essex, St Helens, Greater Huddersfield, Calderdale and North Kirklees CCGs have also expressed interest in running the programme in future.

References 

Organizations established in 2000
Social welfare charities based in the United Kingdom
Organisations based in Manchester
LGBT organisations in England
LGBT political advocacy groups in the United Kingdom
LGBT culture in Manchester